The Green Battalion (al-Katiba al-Khadra) was a jihadist group that was active during the Syrian Civil War. Formed in 2013 by a group of Saudi veterans of the Iraq War and Afghanistan war, the group fought alongside Jabhat al-Nusra and the Islamic State of Iraq and the Levant (ISIL) against Syrian government forces, while remaining independent and neutral in the dispute between ISIL and other groups. The group announced on 25 July 2014 that it became part of Jabhat Ansar al-Din. The group claimed allegiance to Jaish al-Muhajireen wal-Ansar around October 2014.

See also
List of armed groups in the Syrian Civil War

References

External links
  

Anti-government factions of the Syrian civil war
Jihadist groups in Syria
Organizations designated as terrorist by the United Arab Emirates
Organizations based in Asia designated as terrorist